

Places
Orienta, Wisconsin
Orienta, Oklahoma

Things
Orienta (album), 1959 exotica album by The Markko Polo Adventurers
Orienta (ship), yacht owned by Edward R. Ladew
Orienta (moth), of genus Oecophoridae